Spialia zebra, the zebra grizzled skipper, is a butterfly in the family Hesperiidae. It is found in Pakistan, India, Yemen, Oman, Ethiopia, southern Sudan, Uganda, Kenya and north-western Tanzania.

The larvae feed on Melhania (including Melhania ovata and Melhania velutina) and Dombeya species.

Subspecies
Spialia zebra zebra (Pakistan, India: Punjab)
Spialia zebra bifida (Higgins, 1924) (Yemen, Oman, Ethiopia, southern Sudan, Uganda, Kenya, northern Tanzania)

References

Spialia
Butterflies described in 1888
Butterflies of Africa
Taxa named by Arthur Gardiner Butler